Angel Daniel Valladares Pérez is a Mexican professional boxer, who has held the IBF mini flyweight since July 2022.

Professional boxing career

Early career

Career beginnings
Valladares made his professional debut against Carlos Bernal on 14 February 2014. He won the fight by unanimous decision. He amassed a 12–1 record during the next three years, before being booked to face Juan Guadalupe Munoz Vazquez for the vacant WBC Youth Silver light flyweight title on 4 August 2017. He made his first title defense against Erick Zamora, who later missed weight and was ineligible for the belt, on 17 March 2018. He retained his title by a fourth-round technical knockout. He made his second title defense against Adrian Curiel Dominguez on 2 June 2018. He retained the title by unanimous decision, with scores of 95–94, 98–91 and 95–94.

Valladares faced the unbeaten Gilbert Gonzalez on 9 February 2019, in his first fight of the year. He won the fight by unanimous decision, with scores of 98–90, 98–92 and 99–93. Valladares next face the former WBO minimumweight champion Merlito Sabillo in an eight round bout on 13 April 2019. He won the fight by a seventh-round technical knockout. The bout was stopped on the advice of the ringside doctor, due to a cut above the left eye of Sabillo. Valladares faced another undefeated opponent, Christian Araneta, on 7 September 2019 in an IBF mini flyweight title eliminator. He won the fight by a fourth-round stoppage, as Araneta retired from the bout at the end of the round.

Valladares vs. Taduran
Valladares challenged the reigning IBF mini flyweight champion Pedro Taduran on 1 February 2020, at the Jardin Cerveza Expo in Guadalupe, Mexico. The title bout was scheduled as the main event of a Promociones Zanfer promoted card. Taduran retained the title by a fourth-round technical decision, with two judges scoring the fight 38–38, while the third judge scored the fight 39–37 for Valladares. The fight was stopped due to a cut above Valladares' right eye, which was caused by an accidental clash of heads.

Second title run
After failing to capture the title, Valladares was booked to face Hugo Hernandez Aguilar on 22 August 2020. He suffered his second professional loss, as Aguilar won the bout by unanimous decision. Valladares suffered another loss, a majority decision to Mario Gutierrez Gomez on 19 December 2020, before he rebounded with a fourth-round stoppage victory against Abraham Manriquez Gonzalez on 5 March 2021. Valladares was then scheduled to face Julian Yedras on 14 May 2021. He won the fight by a third-round technical knockout. Valladares faced Jose Javier Torres on 4 September 2021, at the Parque La Ruina in Hermosillo, Mexico, in the main event of an TV Azteca broadcast card. He won the fight by unanimous decision, with scores of 95–94, 97–94 and 96–93.

IBF mini flyweight champion

Valladares vs. Cuatro
Valladares was expected to challenge the reigning IBF mini flyweight champion Rene Mark Cuarto on 27 May 2022 in Monterrey, Mexico, in what was to be Cuatro's second title defense. The bout was later cancelled however, due to undisclosed reasons. The fight was later rescheduled for 1 July 2022, and took place at the same location and venue. Valladares won the fight by split decision. Two judges scored the fight 116–111 and 115–112 in his favor, while the third judge scored the bout 114–113 for Cuatro. Cuatro was deducted a point in the tenth round, for loose glove tape.

Valladares vs. Shigeoka
Soon after winning the IBF title, Valladares and his team offered to face the WBA (Regular) mini flyweight champion Erick Rosa in a title unification bout. Rosa accepted and called off his first title defense against Carlos Ortega only hours before it was supposed to take place. These plans later fell through for undisclosed reasons and Valladares was instead booked to make his first IBF title defense against the undefeated Ginjiro Shigeoka. The fight took place on the undercard of the Masataka Taniguchi and Melvin Jerusalem light flyweight championship bout on 6 January 2022, at the Osaka Prefectural Gymnasium in Osaka, Japan. The fight was stopped in the third round, after an accidental clash of heads left Valladares unable to continue fighting, and was ruled a no-contest. All three judges had the bout scored 19–19 at the time of the stoppage.

Professional boxing record

See also
List of world mini-flyweight boxing champions
List of Mexican boxing world champions

References

External links

1995 births
Living people
Mexican male boxers
Boxers from Nuevo León
Sportspeople from Monterrey
Light-flyweight boxers
World mini-flyweight boxing champions
International Boxing Federation champions